A rigid line inclusion, also called stiffener, is a mathematical model used in solid mechanics to describe a narrow hard phase, dispersed within a matrix material. This inclusion is idealised as an infinitely rigid and thin reinforcement, so that it represents a sort of ‘inverse’ crack, from which the nomenclature ‘anticrack’ derives.

From the mechanical point of view, a stiffener introduces a kinematical constraint, imposing that it may only suffer a rigid body motion along its line.

Theoretical model
The stiffener model has been used to investigate different mechanical problems in classical elasticity (load diffusion, inclusion at bi material interface ).

The main characteristics of the theoretical solutions are basically the following.
 Similarly to a fracture, a square-root singularity in the stress/strain fields is present at the tip of the inclusion.
 In a homogeneous matrix subject to uniform stress at infinity, such singularity only arises when a normal stress acts parallel or orthogonal to the inclusion line, while  a stiffener parallel to a simple shear does not disturb the ambient field.

Experimental validation

The characteristics of the elastic solution have been experimentally confirmed through  photoelastic transmission experiments.

Interaction of rigid line inclusions
The interaction of rigid line inclusions in parallel, collinear and radial configurations have been studied using the boundary element method (BEM) and validated using photoelasticity.

Shear bands emerging at the stiffener tip

Analytical solutions obtained in prestressed elasticity show the possibility of the emergence of shear bands at the tip of the stiffener.

References

External links
Laboratory for Physical Modeling of Structures and Photoelasticity (University of Trento, Italy)

Solid mechanics
Rigid bodies mechanics